Cerf or CERF may refer to:

 CERF (Central Emergency Response Fund), a United Nations fund created to aid regions threatened by disaster
 Coastal and Estuarine Research Federation (CERF)
 Cerf (surname)
 Cerf Island, Seychelles
 Cerf Island, Providence Atoll, Seychelles
 , a brig (also named Cerf) captured from the French

See also
 Île aux Cerfs
 Les Éditions du Cerf, a French publisher